Raleigh Climon Owens (November 12, 1934 – June 17, 2012) was a professional American football end and halfback from 1957 through 1964. Owens graduated from Santa Monica High School in Santa Monica, California, and attended the College of Idaho (where his roommate and teammate was Elgin Baylor).  He played amateur basketball with the Seattle-based Buchan Bakers the year after their national championship.

Owens then joined the National Football League (NFL).  He had his best years playing for the San Francisco 49ers, where he was noted for his "Alley Oop" receptions of quarterback Y. A. Tittle's passes.  The Alley Oop was essentially a jump ball, where Tittle would throw the ball high in the air in the end zone, and Owens would jump up and get it.  The tall, long-armed Owens was known for his jumping ability; he once blocked a field goal by jumping up at the cross bar and knocking it down. The next season, "goal tending" was made illegal. Owens's best year by far was 1961, when he gained over 1,000 yards receiving.

Owens played four games for the 1961-1962 San Francisco Saints of the American Basketball League.

He died on June 17, 2012.

References

History of the Buchan Bakers
Discussion of the term "alley oop" with citations of references to Owens
Yahoo Sports: former 49ers receiver, executive dies at age 78
Los Angeles Times: R.C. Owens obituary
Quirky Research: Palpably unfair acts

1934 births
2012 deaths
Amateur Athletic Union men's basketball players
American football wide receivers
Baltimore Colts players
College of Idaho Coyotes football players
College of Idaho Coyotes men's basketball players
New York Giants players
San Francisco 49ers players
San Francisco Saints players
Players of American football from Shreveport, Louisiana
Players of American football from Santa Monica, California
Basketball players from Shreveport, Louisiana
Basketball players from California
American men's basketball players